The 1979 Oakland Athletics season involved the A's finishing 7th in the American League West Division with a record of 54 wins and 108 losses. Only 306,763 paying customers (an average of 3,984 for 77 home dates; there were four doubleheaders) showed up to watch the A's in 1979, the team's worst attendance since leaving Philadelphia.

Team owner Charlie Finley nearly sold the team to buyers who would have moved them to New Orleans for 1979. Any deal to relocate fell through when the city of Oakland refused to release the A's from their lease. The city was in the midst of its battle with the Oakland Raiders over their move to Los Angeles and didn't want to lose both teams.

The Athletics' 54-108 finish remains, as of 2022, their worst (by far) since moving to Oakland in 1968. On a brighter note, the season saw the debut of Rickey Henderson. Henderson, a future Hall-of-Famer, would play for the team (in four separate stints) between 1979 and 1998.

Offseason 
 October 3, 1978: Rico Carty was purchased from the Athletics by the Toronto Blue Jays.
 January 9, 1979: Lemmie Miller was drafted by the Athletics in the 1st round (6th pick) of the 1979 Major League Baseball Draft, but did not sign.
 February 26, 1979: Darryl Cias was purchased by the Athletics from the Salem Senators.
 February 28, 1979: Jim Todd was signed as a free agent by the Athletics.

Regular season 
On April 17, 1979, the A's had their smallest home crowd (and one of the smallest in a major league baseball game in the 20th century) when only 653 people came to the nearly 50,000 seat Oakland–Alameda County Coliseum to see them beat the Seattle Mariners, 6 to 5.

On June 24, Rickey Henderson made his major league debut against the Texas Rangers. In four at bats, Henderson had two hits and a stolen base.

Season standings

Record vs. opponents

Notable transactions 
 June 5, 1979: Ronn Reynolds was drafted by the Athletics in the 5th round of the 1979 Major League Baseball Draft, but did not sign.
 June 15, 1979: Mark Souza was signed as a free agent by the Athletics.

Roster

Player stats

Batting

Starters by position 
Note: Pos = Position; G = Games played; AB = At bats; H = Hits; Avg. = Batting average; HR = Home runs; RBI = Runs batted in

Other batters 
Note: G = Games played; AB = At bats; H = Hits; Avg. = Batting average; HR = Home runs; RBI = Runs batted in

Pitching

Starting pitchers 
Note: G = Games pitched; IP = Innings pitched; W = Wins; L = Losses; ERA = Earned run average; SO = Strikeouts

Other pitchers 
Note: G = Games pitched; IP = Innings pitched; W = Wins; L = Losses; ERA = Earned run average; SO = Strikeouts

Relief pitchers 
Note: G = Games pitched; W = Wins; L = Losses; SV = Saves; ERA = Earned run average; SO = Strikeouts

Farm system

References

External links
1979 Oakland Athletics team page at Baseball Reference
1979 Oakland Athletics team page at www.baseball-almanac.com

Oakland Athletics seasons
Oakland Athletics season
Oakland